These are the rosters of all participating teams at the women's water polo tournament at the 2004 Summer Olympics in Athens.

Pool A

The following is the Australian roster in the women's water polo tournament of the 2004 Summer Olympics.

Head coach: István Gorgenyi

The following is the Greek roster in the women's water polo tournament of the 2004 Summer Olympics.

Head coach: Kyriakos Iosifidis

The following is the Italian roster in the women's water polo tournament of the 2004 Summer Olympics.

Head coach: Pierluigi Formiconi

The following is the Kazakh roster in the women's water polo tournament of the 2004 Summer Olympics.

Head coach:  Stanislav Pivovarov

Pool B

The following is the Canadian roster in the women's water polo tournament of the 2004 Summer Olympics.

Head coach: Patrick Oaten

The following is the Hungarian roster in the women's water polo tournament of the 2004 Summer Olympics.

Head coach: Tamás Faragó

The following is the Russian roster in the men's water polo tournament of the 2004 Summer Olympics.

Head coach: Alexander Kleymenov

The following is the American roster in the women's water polo tournament of the 2004 Summer Olympics.

Head coach: Guy Baker

References

External links
Official Olympic Coverage

Women's team rosters
2004
2004 in women's water polo